Hur Moghan-e Sofla (also Romanized as Hūr Moghān-e Soflá and Hoor Moghan Sofla; also known as  Ḩūrī Moghān-e Soflá, Ḩūr Moghān-e Pā’īn, Ḩūr Moqān-e Pā’īn, and Nizhnyaya Gurman) is a village in Peyghan Chayi Rural District, in the Central District of Kaleybar County, East Azerbaijan Province, Iran. At the 2006 census, its population was 17, in 5 families.

References 

Populated places in Kaleybar County